Daniel Barker (born 30 January 1987) is a former footballer who played as a goalkeeper. Born in England, he represented the British Virgin Islands at international level.

Club career
Born in Oxford, Barker was a Yeovil Town youth graduate before being promoted to the main squad in 2006, being assigned the  23 shirt. He was released in 2007, after a spell on loan at Tiverton Town.

Barker also represented Wincanton Town for a period between 2011 and 2014.

International career
Barker made his first appearance for the British Virgin Islands national football team on 21 September 2014, starting in a 0–6 friendly loss against St. Vincent and the Grenadines.

References

External links

1987 births
Living people
Footballers from Oxford
English footballers
British Virgin Islands footballers
Association football goalkeepers
Yeovil Town F.C. players
Tiverton Town F.C. players
British Virgin Islands international footballers